Ricola macrops is the only species of the monotypic genus Ricola, a genus of the family Loricariidae of catfish (order Siluriformes).

Ecological and behavioral data are unavailable for this species. This species is native to Argentina and Uruguay where it occurs in the lower Paraná River basin. R. macrops probably inhabits sandy substrates with flowing waters. R. macrops reaches a length of  SL.

It shares features with representatives of different groups within Loricariini. For example, it possesses conspicuous fringed barbels on the lower lip, a feature shared by the representatives of the Pseudohemiodon group. It also bears numerous papillae on the inner surfaces of the lips and numerous straight bicuspid teeth that are characteristic of the Rineloricaria group.

References

Loricariini
Fish described in 1904
Fish of South America
Fish of Argentina
Fish of Uruguay
Taxa named by Charles Tate Regan